The  is a  mixed-use skyscraper in Roppongi, Minato ward, Tokyo. The building was designed by Irie Miyake Architects and Engineers and Pelli Clarke Pelli Architects, while the construction process was managed by Obayashi Corporation. In addition, it was developed by Mori Building Company. Construction of the tower started in 2009 and completed in 2012. It has 47 storeys.

The building is situated on  land area near Ark Hills and close to the Kamiyachō Station on the Tokyo Metro Hibiya Line, and Roppongi-itchōme Station on the Tokyo Metro Namboku Line. It is also surrounded by gardens that were designed to replicate the natural wildlife in Tokyo.

Design

Seismic design 
The building was designed to withstand earthquakes and strong winds by using two different types of mass dampers. The first damper type is the viscous vibration damping walls (the "sticky wall") that was designed to sustain small- and medium-size earthquakes, while the second damper type is the brake damper that was designed to sustain major earthquakes.

Facade and primary uses 
The primary functions of the building are distinguished by its facade. The retail and commercial uses of the building, which are located on floors 1-2, are represented by the glass and stone facade with the squared-shape building corners; the apartments, which are located on floors 3-24, are distinguished by its balconies with the rounded-shape building corners; while the offices, which are located on floors 25-47, are covered by the glass with the building corners are subtly stepped back, forming the cone-like shape on the upper parts of the building.

See also 
 List of tallest buildings in Tokyo

References

Notes

Citations

Books

External links 
Ark Hills Sengokuyama Mori Tower (in Japanese), Mori Building

Roppongi
Mori Building
Skyscraper office buildings in Tokyo
Office buildings completed in 2012
Buildings and structures in Minato, Tokyo
2012 establishments in Japan
Retail buildings in Tokyo